Terror of the Bloodhunters is a 1962 independently made American black-and-white low budget jungle survival horror film, produced, directed, written, and edited by Jerry Warren, that stars Robert Clarke, Dorothy Haney, and Steve Conte.
 
The film was released in the U.S. May 3, 1962 as a double feature with Warren's Invasion of the Animal People.

Premise
The daughter (Dorothy Haney) of the Devil's Island commandant takes off with two escaped French prisoners (Robert Clarke and Steve Conte) through the treacherous jungles of French Guiana. They must survive not only dangerous wild animals and disease, but the prison guards who are searching for them, as well as a ferocious South American tribe of headhunters.

Cast
Robert Clarke as Steve Duval
Dorothy Haney as Marlene
Robert Christopher as Whorf
William White as Dione
Steve Conte as Cabot
Niles Andrus as Commandant
Herbert Clarke as Muller
Darrold Westbrooke as Jacobe
Mike Concannon as Lt. Vaardo
Charles Niles Sr. as Estes
Alberto Soria as Officer

Production
Terror of the Bloodhunters was shot in Griffith Park in Los Angeles, with a lot of stock footage added from other films.

References

Footnotes

Sources

External links

1962 films
1962 horror films
American horror films
American independent films
Films directed by Jerry Warren
Films set on Devil's Island
Films shot in Los Angeles
1960s English-language films
1960s American films